Sister Against Sister is a 1917 American silent drama film directed by James Vincent and starring Virginia Pearson, Maud Hall Macy and Walter Law.

Cast
 Virginia Pearson as Anne / Katherine 
 Maud Hall Macy as Mrs. Martin 
 Walter Law as Huxley 
 Irving Cummings as Dunsmore 
 Calla Dillatore as Mrs. Raymond 
 William Battista as Peter Raymond 
 Archie Battista as Johnny Raymond 
 Jane Lee as Alice Reynolds

References

Bibliography
 Solomon, Aubrey. The Fox Film Corporation, 1915-1935: A History and Filmography. McFarland, 2011.

External links
 

1917 films
1917 drama films
1910s English-language films
American silent feature films
Silent American drama films
American black-and-white films
Films directed by James Vincent
Fox Film films
1910s American films